Bortolami is an Italian surname. Notable people with the surname include:

Gianluca Bortolami (born 1968), Italian road cyclist
Marco Bortolami (born 1980), Italian rugby union player

See also
Bertolami

Italian-language surnames